The Story of Adèle H. is a 1975 French historical drama film directed by François Truffaut, and starring Isabelle Adjani, Bruce Robinson, and Sylvia Marriott. Written by Truffaut, Jean Gruault, and Suzanne Schiffman, the film is about Adèle Hugo, the daughter of writer Victor Hugo, whose obsessive unrequited love for a military officer leads to her downfall. The story is based on Adèle Hugo's diaries. It was filmed on location in Guernsey, and Senegal.

20-year-old Isabelle Adjani received much critical acclaim for her performance as Hugo, garnering an Oscar nomination for Best Actress in a Leading Role, making her the youngest Best Actress nominee ever at the time. The Story of Adèle H. also won the National Board of Review Award for Best Foreign Language Film, the French Syndicate of Cinema Critics Award for Best Film, and the Cartagena Film Festival Special Critics Award.

Plot
In 1863, the American Civil War is raging, and Great Britain and France have yet to enter into the conflict. For the past year, British troops have been stationed in Halifax, Nova Scotia, carefully checking European passengers disembarking from foreign ships. The beautiful Adèle Hugo (Isabelle Adjani), the second daughter of Victor Hugo, makes it through and takes a carriage into Halifax. Traveling under the assumed name of Miss Lewly, Adèle finds accommodations at a boarding house run by Mr. and Mrs. Saunders.

Adèle finds a notary and inquires about a British officer, Lieutenant Albert Pinson (Bruce Robinson), with whom she's had a relationship. Later that day Adèle sees Pinson at a book shop. When she learns that Mr. Saunders will be attending a military dinner which Pinson is likely to attend, Adèle asks him to deliver a letter from her—a love letter announcing her arrival. While showing some old photographs to Mrs. Saunders, she talks about her older sister Léopoldine Hugo, who died in a drowning accident at the age of 19 many years ago just after being married. When Mr. Saunders returns from the dinner, he tells her that he gave Pinson her letter but he did not reply. That night, Adèle has nightmares about drowning.

The next day, Adèle writes to her parents, telling them that she must be with her beloved Pinson and that they are planning to marry, but she will wait for their formal consent. She spends her evenings writing in her journal about her life and her love for Pinson. "I'll be able to win him over through gentleness", she writes. Pinson goes to the boarding house, where he tells Adèle that she must leave Halifax and must stop following him. Adèle believes that if they marry, all his concerns will be resolved. Pinson knows that her parents do not approve of him and his heavy gambling debts. Adèle tries to persuade him, telling him that she's rejected another marriage proposal, threatens to expose him and ruin his military career, and even offers him money for his gambling debts, but he remains unmoved.

In the coming days, Adèle continues writing in her journal, convinced that she is Pinson's wife in spirit. She tries to conjure the ghost of her dead sister to help her. One night, she follows Pinson to the home of his mistress, where she watches them make love. Undeterred, Adèle continues her writing, and her behavior becomes more eccentric. Mr. Whistler (Joseph Blatchley), the kind bookseller who provides her with writing paper, shows an interest in her. As she leaves his book shop, she faints from exhaustion. Mr. Whistler visits her at the boarding house and brings her paper, but she refuses to see him. Doctor Murdock (Roger Martin) visits and diagnoses a mild case of pleurisy. He notices one of her letters is addressed to Victor Hugo and informs Mrs. Saunders of the true identity of her boarder.

Adèle's obsession grows stronger. One day, she writes to her parents telling them that she has married Pinson and that from now on, she should be addressed as Madame Pinson. Upon receiving the news, Victor Hugo posts an announcement of the marriage in his local paper. The news reaches Pinson's colonel. After Pinson writes Victor Hugo to explain that he never will marry Adèle, Hugo writes to his daughter, urging her to return home to Guernsey. Adèle responds to her father's letter with more fantasy, urging her parents to accept Pinson.

Having learned of Adèle's identity, Mr. Whistler offers her a gift of her father's books. She responds in anger and paranoia. She hires a prostitute as a gift for Pinson. She follows him to a theater to see a hypnotist, where she is inspired to think that she can hypnotize Pinson into loving her; she is forced to abandon this plan once she learns that the hypnosis was faked. Adèle begins to go mad with despair. She goes to the father of Pinson's fiancée and claims that he is married to her and that she is carrying his child. The father ends the engagement. She finds Pinson once more, and he again rebukes her, calling her ridiculous. After leaving the boarding house, Adèle continues to deteriorate. She wanders the streets in torn clothes, talking to herself.

In February 1864, Pinson is shipped out to Barbados, and a destitute Adèle follows him. Now married, Pinson learns that Adèle is in Barbados claiming to be his wife. Concerned for her, Pinson searches for her and finds her wandering the streets in rags. When he tries to confront her, Adèle does not acknowledge or recognize him. Helped by a kind former slave, Adèle returns to Paris, where the French Third Republic has been established. Her father places her in an asylum in Saint-Mandé, where she lives for the next 40 years. She gardens, plays the piano and writes in her journal. Adèle Hugo dies in Paris in 1915 at the age of 85.

Cast

 Isabelle Adjani as Adèle Hugo / Adèle Lewry
 Bruce Robinson as Lieutenant Albert Pinson
 Sylvia Marriott as Mrs. Saunders
 Joseph Blatchley as Mr. Whistler, bookseller
 Ivry Gitlis as Showman/Fake Hypnotist
 Louise Bourdet as Victor Hugo's servant
 Cecil de Sausmarez as Mr. Lenoir, notary
 Ruben Dorey as Mr. Saunders
 Clive Gillingham as Keaton
 Roger Martin as Doctor Murdock
 M. White as Colonel White
 Madame Louise as Madame Baa
 Raymond Falla OBE as Judge Johnstone
 Jean-Pierre Leursse as Black penpusher
 Carl Hathwell as Lieutenant Pinson's Batman (uncredited)
 François Truffaut as Officer (uncredited)

Production
Writing about the film, François Truffaut observed:

Truffaut had to get the rights from Jean Hugo, Victor Hugo's direct descendant. He gave his consent after reading a treatment on the condition that Victor Hugo did not appear on screen.

Finance was originally sought from Warner Bros but they turned it down as being too literary. The film was financed by United Artists. The original budget was five million francs so the script was simplified to focus more on Adèle.

Although Truffaut had once promised the role to Catherine Deneuve, he wanted a new star to play the lead. He screen tested Stacey Tendeter then was impressed by Isabelle Adjani's performances in La Gifle (1974) and on stage, and decided to cast her. She was under contract as a stage actress to the Comédie-Française who refused to release her from her contract. It became a legal dispute but in the end Adjani was able to play the part.

Filming locations
Most of the exterior scenes were shot on location in Guernsey, Channel Islands. Many of the film extras were well-known locals. Both Raymond Falla and Sir Cecil de Sausmarez were, at the time, prominent island politicians. Scenes set in Halifax were mainly interiors created in a house in St. Peter Port, Guernsey. None of the scenes were filmed in Halifax. The Barbados scenes were shot on the island of Gorée off Senegal.

As was his custom, Truffaut fell for his leading lady during the shoot. However Adjani rebuffed his advances. She did not like to rehearse and filming in Guernsey was an intense emotional experience for most of the crew. Truffaut later wrote to a friend:
You mention the pleasure I must have directing Isabelle A. It's the opposite of pleasure, it's daily suffering for me, and almost an agony for her. For her profession is her religion, and because of that our shoot is a trial for everyone. It would be too easy to say she is difficult, she is not. She is different from all the women in this profession and since she isn't even 20, add to all this (to her genius, let's not be afraid of words), an unawareness of others and their vulnerability, which creates an unbelievable tension.
Instead Adjani had an affair with Bruce Robinson during the making of the film.

The film was shot in English and French versions.

Reception

Critical response
In her book When the Lights Go Down, the American film critic Pauline Kael gave the film a very positive review: 

In his review in the Chicago Sun-Times, Roger Ebert gave the film four stars, calling it "a strange, moody film that belongs very much with the darker side of his [Truffaut's] work." Ebert continues:

In his review in The New York Times, Vincent Canby called it a "profoundly beautiful" film that is Truffaut's "most severe, most romantic meditation upon love." Canby continues:

On the review aggregator web site Rotten Tomatoes, the film holds a 92% positive rating from top film critics based on 24 reviews.

Box office
The Story of Adèle H. was a modest financial success in France, where it sold 752,160 tickets. It was considered a box office disappointment.

Awards and nominations

See also
Cinema of France
List of French-language films
List of oldest and youngest Academy Award winners and nominees – Youngest nominees for Best Actress in a Leading Role
Mental disorders in film

Notes

References
Citations

Further reading

External links
 
 
 

1975 films
1970s biographical drama films
1970s historical drama films
French biographical drama films
French historical drama films
1970s French-language films
1970s English-language films
Films about psychiatry
Films about stalking
Films shot in Senegal
Films set in 1863
Films set in 1864
Films set in Nova Scotia
Films set in Barbados
Films set in Paris
Films set in Guernsey
Films directed by François Truffaut
Films with screenplays by François Truffaut
Cultural depictions of Victor Hugo
English-language French films
1975 drama films
1970s French films